Rostanga lutescens, is a species of sea slug, a dorid nudibranch, a marine gastropod mollusc in the family Discodorididae.

Distribution
This species was described from Timor, Indonesia. It has subsequently been reported from the Marshall Islands.Rudman, W.B., 2002 (February 4) [http://www.seaslugforum.net/factsheet/rostlute Rostanga lutescens Rudman & Avern, 1989. [In] Sea Slug Forum. Australian Museum, Sydney.

Description
This dorid nudibranch is a pale, translucent orange or yellow in colour, and the dorsum is covered with caryophyllidia.

Ecology
Most species of Rostanga'' feed on sponges of the family Microcionidae.

References

Discodorididae
Gastropods described in 1905